Teuku Jacob (6 December 1929 – 17 October 2007) was an Indonesian paleoanthropologist. As a student of Gustav Heinrich Ralph von Koenigswald in the 1950s, Jacob claimed to have discovered and studied numerous specimens of Homo erectus. He came to international prominence as a vocal critic of scientists who believed remains discovered in Flores belonged to a new species in the genus Homo, Homo floresiensis.

Career
Jacob studied at Gadjah Mada University's School of Medicine  from 1950 to 1956; University of Arizona from 1957 to 1958; Howard University from 1958 to 1960, and finally Utrecht University, where he completed his doctorate in anthropology in 1967. As a young adult, Jacob actively participated in the Indonesian National Revolution, producing a nationalist radio program. After the end of the Japanese occupation of Indonesia during World War II, Jacob served in the Indonesian armed forces. From 1982 to 1987, Jacob was also a member of the People's Consultative Assembly.

Jacob died in Dr. Sardjito Hospital at the age of 77 after suffering from a debilitating liver disease.

Homo floresiensis
Jacob came to international prominence when he expressed his disagreement with scientists who claimed that remains found on the island of Flores constituted a new human species, labeled Homo floresiensis. Jacob insisted that the remains were those of microcephalic modern humans. In early December 2004, Jacob removed most of the remains from Soejono's institution, Jakarta's National Research Centre of Archaeology, for his own research without the permission of the centre's directors.

Jacob eventually returned the remains with portions severely damaged and missing two leg bones on February 23, 2005. Reports noted the condition of the returned remains included "long, deep cuts marking the lower edge of the Hobbit's jaw on both sides, said to be caused by a knife used to cut away the rubber mould"; "the chin of a second Hobbit snapped off and glued back together. Whoever was responsible misaligned the pieces and put them at an incorrect angle"; and, "The pelvis was smashed, destroying details that reveal body shape, gait and evolutionary history". This prompted the discovery team leader Morwood to remark "It's sickening, Jacob was greedy and acted totally irresponsibly".

Jacob, however, denied any wrongdoing. He stated that such damage occurred during transport from Yogyakarta back to Jakarta despite the physical evidence to the contrary that the jawbone had been broken while making a mold of bones.

In 2005 Indonesian officials forbade access to the cave and thus no other excavations in the place were possible. The BBC expressed the opinion that the reason for the restriction was to protect Jacob from being proven wrong. Scientists were allowed to return to the cave in 2007, the same year that Jacob died from liver disease.

References 

1929 births
2007 deaths
Acehnese people
People from Peureulak
People from Yogyakarta
Paleoanthropologists
Indonesian anthropologists
Indonesian scientists
Utrecht University alumni
Gadjah Mada University alumni
Academic staff of Gadjah Mada University
Members of the People's Consultative Assembly
Deaths from liver disease
20th-century anthropologists